The Hospital Point Range Rear Light is part of a pair of range lights in Beverly, Massachusetts. It is located in the steeple of the First Baptist Church of Beverly.

History
The Hospital Point Light was established to help guide ships through Salem Sound. It was originally established as a single light, but in 1927 the beacon from a lightship was used to create a range, with the existing light made the front light. This beacon was set in the steeple of the First Baptist Church, the tallest spire in town; it projects a very narrow beam, only 2° either side of the range course, leading across the northern part of the sound. The church was destroyed in a fire in 1975, but the steeple survived; it was incorporated into the rebuilt church. The light continues in active service.

References

External links 
 First Baptist Church of Beverly website

Lighthouses completed in 1927
Lighthouses in Essex County, Massachusetts